This is a list of the governors of the province of Zabul, Afghanistan.

Governors of Zabul Province

See also
 List of current governors of Afghanistan

References

Zabul